Liga Deportiva Alajuelense (LDA), commonly known as Alajuelense and nicknamed La Liga, is a Costa Rican multisport club based in the borough of El Llano, Alajuela, Alajuela province. Although they compete in a number of different sports, Alajuelense is mostly known for its association football team. It plays in the Primera División de Costa Rica, the top tier of the Costa Rican football league system. Alajuelense is one of two clubs to have never been relegated, along with Herediano.

Alajuelense was founded on the former Paris Hall, west of Alajuela's Central Park, on June 18, 1919, by six former players of a historic city club, Once de Abril, with the intention of uniting all the sportsmen and associations present at that time in Alajuela under a single banner. However, it wouldn't be until 1928 when Alajuelense managed to become national champions for the first time in a season that saw the club's first star: Alejandro Morera. Morera, who would later go on to become Barcelona's main striker for two seasons, is regarded as one of the finest players Costa Rica has ever produced. He would later manage Alajuelense to their second national title in 1939 as well as two others in 1941 and 1945. Since then, Alajuelense has become one of the most supported football clubs in Costa Rica.

Alajuelense is one of the most successful teams in Costa Rica and Central America, having won 30 national championships. They have also won two CONCACAF Champions League titles, one CONCACAF League, and three Copa Interclubes UNCAF. Alajuelense was the first Costa Rican club to win an official international competition when they defeated Suranamese club Transvaal in the final series in 1986. Alajuelense has also participated in the Interamerican Cup, Copa Merconorte, and Copa Sudamericana. In 1996, Alajuelense became the first club in the world to reach 100 points in any national league, finishing with a total of 102 points. This feat was repeated in 1998 and 2000 with 105 and 102 points gained, respectively.

Alajuelense plays its home matches at the Estadio Alejandro Morera Soto. Alajuelense's home kit is composed of red and black vertical striped shirts, with black shorts, accompanied by red or black socks. This combination has been used since the club's foundation. Kelme are the kit manufacturers. Alajuelense holds many long-standing rivalries, most notably against Saprissa, Herediano, and Cartaginés. It has contributed many key and famous players towards Costa Rica's FIFA World Cup squads such as José Carlos Chaves, Óscar Ramírez, Mauricio Montero, Wilmer López, Luis Marín, Jhonny Acosta, and Patrick Pemberton.

History
The team was created in 1919 when a group of friends that used to play in a team called the "Electra" at first and then "Once de Abril" (April the 11th) met at "Salon París". They wanted to give the city a team that could represent them at a national level. They played their first official game on August 2 of that same year against Cartaginés getting their first victory, 3–1.

Alajuelense was part of the 7 teams that built and formed the National League in Costa Rica, back in 1921, along with La Libertad, Gimnástica Española, Herediano, Cartaginés, CS Tres Rios de La Union, and Sociedad Gimnástica Limonense. They won their first championship in 1928. They are the only team to win the championship with a perfect record; in 1941 they won all 6 games. In 1960, the team made a tour around the world, leaving Costa Rica on September 17. In 78 days, the team played 24 games, winning 12, losing seven and drawing five. They scored 71 goals and allowed 47, with a remarkable performance from Juan Ulloa Ramírez, the best player and top scorer of this tour.

Throughout their history, Alajuelense has generated a lot of great players and stunning performances. They are known as one of the best teams in the Central America area. Their best decade was the 1990s, during which they won 4 Championships and 4 sub-championships (runner up) as well. In addition to that, by the end of the 90's and the middle of the 2000s, they won a total of 5 local championships (4 of them in a row), 2 Copa Interclubes UNCAF Trophies and a CONCACAF Club Championship, being the base for the Costa Rican football team in the Korea and Japan 2002 FIFA World Cup, with 9 players.

By November 11, 2000, and after participating in the Copa Merconorte, Alajuelense was ranked 27th in IFFHS's Club World Ranking. It is the best rank any Central American club has reached.

The club struggled with financial and administrative problems in the second part on the 2000s decade, so they decided to end contract with a lot of their regular and known players and started to build a team based on their younger divisions and make some structural changes. Nowadays the club is free of debts and with a team averaging 25-year-old players is still one of the best teams in the area and one of the teams with most fans in Costa Rica. On June 10, 2019, the club celebrated its 100th anniversary, being the second Costa Rican team to do so.

Stadium

The Estadio Alejandro Morera Soto is the home of Alajuelense and is owned and operated by La Liga Deportiva Alajuelense. It is located in El Llano neighborhood of Alajuela.

On July 20, 1966, due to a motion by the Municipality of Alajuela, the stadium was renamed in honor of Alejandro Morera, nicknamed el mago del balón, which means the magician of the ball. He was a notable former player of Alajuelense, Barcelona, and Hércules, and for commercial purposes, in an agreement with the financial institution Scotiabank in 2011, the name Scotiabank was added.

The project to find a proper site for a permanent home started in 1938, when the director of the club, Carlos Bolaños, proposed that the club should purchase its own land. The land was purchased on October 7, 1940, but the terrain would not be football-ready until when the first game was played on January 18, 1942, when Alajuelense played against Cartaginés; the stadium only had a simple wooden stand that was previously used in the Estadio Nacional.

On September 27, 1949, a professor from a local high school named Armando Morux Sancho started what was called La marcha del ladrillo, meaning The March of Bricks in which every student would donate a brick to help build the walls and stands of the stadium. The first stands to be built were located in north, west and east around the pitch.

On March 19, 1970, the stadium saw its first night game when Alajuelense faced Honduran club Motagua, beating them 4–1.

In 1979, the enlargement of the stadium was initiated with the project of building a second stand on top of the existing stand and adding an additional stand over the dressing and conference rooms (south) and also adding a roof to the stands located to the east and the south. The project was fully completed in 1984. The stadium was re-inaugurated that year along with the new illuminations, which were amongst the best illuminations systems at the time.

On 8 April 2021, the team announced plans for a new stadium, with an expected opening by January 2025.

Mascot
The team is now represented by a Lion dressed with the team uniform and wearing cleats as if he was going to play.

In every home game, the mascot comes out at the pitch before the game starts and plays on the field with fans, jokes with rival's fans, walk through the pitch with models giving away gifts from their sponsors and cheers the team with a huge team's flag. Before the game starts and during the half-time break, the Lion walks among the crowd and stands for pictures with the children.

The original mascot used to be a Mango, this because the team is located in Alajuela that is known as "La Ciudad de los Mangos" ("The Mangoes' City") because of the high amount of Mango Trees that could be located in the province due its weather, but later on in the early 80's, the mascot was changed into a Lion.

The Lion was chosen years ago because it represents four main attributes of the major king of the jungle, that are reflected on the team's vision and mission: Courage, Strength, Dynamism and Fidelity.

Sponsors
 Jersey supplier

Jersey sponsors

Kolbi – Tuasa  – Repretel – Cementos Fortaleza –  Toyota – Mobil

Honours

National
 Primera División de Costa Rica
Champions (30): 1928, 1939, 1941, 1945, 1949, 1950, 1958, 1959, 1960, 1966, 1970, 1971, 1980, 1983, 1984, 1991, 1992, 1995–96, 1996–97, 1999–00, 2000–01, 2001–02, 2002–03, 2004–05, Invierno 2010–11, Verano 2010–11, Invierno 2011–12, Invierno 2012–13. Invierno 2013–14, Invierno 2020–21.
Runners-up (24): 1930, 1928, 1944, 1952, 1957, 1962, 1965, 1967, 1969, 1972, 1985, 1986, 1989, 1993–94, 1994–95, 1997–98, 1998–99, 2006–07, 2007–08, Invierno 2008–09 Verano 2014, Verano 2015, Invierno 2015, Verano 2016.

 Costa Rican Cup
Champion (10): 1926, 1928, 1937, 1941, 1944, 1948, 1949, 1967, 1974, 1977.
Runner-up (2): 1938, 1947.

 Costa Rican Super Cup

Champion (1): 2012.

Costa Rican Short Championships
Champion (9): 1997-1998, 1999-2000, 2000-2001, 2002-2003, 1999-2000, 2000-2001, 2001-2002, 2002-2003, 2004-2005.
Runner-up (4): 2006-2007,1997-1998, 2005-2006, 2006-2007.

 Friendly & other tournaments:

2012, 2013: Copa Ibérico, against Saprissa
2014, 2015: Super Clásico, against Saprissa
1944, 1945: Torneos Relámpagos Fútbol

International

CONCACAF Champions' Cup: Champion (2): 1986, 2004
Runners-up (3): 1971, 1992, 1999CONCACAF League:
Champion (1):  2020

Copa Interamericana: 1 appearance
Runners-up (1): 1986

UNCAF Club Championship: 17 appearances
Champion (3): 1996, 2002, 2005
Runners-up (2): 1999, 2000

Central American Champions

Champion (2): 1988, 1992.

Central American & Caribbean Champions

Champion (1): 1961

 Friendly & other tournaments:
1994: KLM Cup, against Borussia Dortmund & Saprissa
2004: Copa Taca de Campeon de Campeones de America, against Once Caldas (former Copa Libertadores Champion)

CONCACAF League Fair Play:
Winners (1): 2020

Performance in CONCACAF competitions
CONCACAF Champions League: 26 appearances

1962 – Second Round (Quarter-finals)
1968 – First Round
1971 – Finalist
1973 – Third Round (Quarter-finals)
1986 – Champion
1988 – Semi-finals
1991 – Third Round (Quarter-finals)
1992 – Finalist
1993 – Second Round (Quarter-finals)

1995 – Third Place
1996 – Second Round
1997 – Second Round
1998 – Quarter-finals
1999 – Finalist
2000 – Quarter-finals
2002 – Semi-finals
2003 – Quarter-finals

2004 – Champion
2006 – Semi-finals
2008-09 – First Round
2011–12 – Group Stage
2012–13 – Group Stage
2013–14 – Semi-finals
2014–15 – Semi-finals
2021 – Round of 16
2023 – Round of 16

CONCACAF League: 4 appearances

2017 – First Round
2020 – Champion
2021 – First Round
2022 – Finalist

Recent seasons

Below are listed the club's history performances in national compétition.

Player records

|-

Current squad
As of 22 February 2023

Notable players

Retired numbers

20 –  Mauricio Montero, defender (1987–98)

Notes

References

External links

  

 
Association football clubs established in 1919
Football clubs in Costa Rica
1919 establishments in Costa Rica
A
A
A